Gordon Lamont Brown (1 November 1947 – 19 March 2001) was a Scottish rugby union footballer. Nicknamed "Broon frae Troon" (i.e. Brown from Troon, his home town), Brown is considered one of Scotland's greatest-ever rugby players. Playing as a second row forward, he was an integral part of Scotland's tight five during the early 1970s, along with Ian McLauchlan, Sandy Carmichael, Frank Laidlaw and Alastair McHarg, which became known collectively as the Mean Machine. He also represented the British and Irish Lions on three tours with distinction. Brown was inducted into the International Rugby Hall of Fame in 2001, which later integrated with the World Rugby Hall of Fame, into which he was inducted in 2015. He was also an inductee to the Scottish Rugby Union Hall of Fame in 2010.

Family
Brown was from a sporting family, his elder brother Peter also played for and captained the Scottish side. His father, John played goalkeeper for the Scottish football side and also appeared in the Scottish Open at Royal Troon alongside golfing greats such as Arnold Palmer.

He is also the nephew of footballers Tom and Jim Brown.

Speaking of the brothers Brown, he thinks their skill was in their genes, but that Peter and Gordon were very different:

Rugby
A product of Marr College and West of Scotland, Brown won his first cap for Scotland on 6 December 1969 against South Africa in a 6-3 victory at Murrayfield Stadium. He retained his place for the Five Nations opener against France but was dropped for the Wales match for his brother Peter. Gordon Brown then went on to replace Peter Brown at half-time due to injury, and this was the first time a brother replaced a brother in an international match.

He was selected on the 1971 British Lions tour to New Zealand and despite two other second row forwards travelling, Brown achieved test selection. He went on the 1974 British Lions tour to South Africa where he won five caps, and partnered Willie John McBride in the engine room of the scrum, during which he scored a remarkable eight tries and won a further 3 caps. He went on a third tour and played in a non-cap match against Fiji at the end of the 1977 British Lions tour to New Zealand.

A major criticism of Brown was that he played better for the British Lions than his own country. Although, on a Lions tour he was given the ability to live and train as a full time rugby player and, with world class teammates.

Unfortunately his International rugby career came to a somewhat inauspicious end. In December, 1976, he was playing in a match between Glasgow and the North-Midlands, he was suspended for three months after getting into a fight with Allan Hardie, in which Brown chased Hardie, threw him to the ground and kicked him. Prior to this, Hardie had kneed Brown in the face and proceed to stamp on the open wound on Brown's brow after the initial attack went unnoticed by the referee. The suspension meant that he missed three internationals and was banned from training at any rugby club. He trained daily at Ibrox stadium under the guidance of Jock Wallace of Rangers who put him through a gruelling fitness regime. Gordon remembered being made to sprint up and down the terraces at Ibrox until he was sick. After missing three months of rugby he was selected for the British Lions tour of New Zealand 1977. Because of a string of injuries, he never played for Scotland again. LP

Death
Gordon Brown died from non-Hodgkin lymphoma aged 53 in March 2001. His funeral was attended by former Scotland and Lions team mates and opponents from the whole rugby world.

As reported by The Daily Telegraph, at a fundraising dinner held in late February 2001 for Brown due to his illness, he met with de Bruyn again.

Notes

References
 
 Bath, Richard (ed. 1997) The Complete Book of Rugby, Seven Oaks, 
 Massie, Allan (1984), A Portrait of Scottish Rugby, Edinburgh: Polygon,

External links 
 profile on ESPN
 profile on British and Irish Lions
 Gordon Brown in The Scotsman newspaper
 Broon frae Troon by Jeff Connor (Scotsman newspaper)

1947 births
2001 deaths
British & Irish Lions rugby union players from Scotland
Marr RFC players
People educated at Marr College
Rugby union locks
Rugby union players from Troon
Scotland international rugby union players
Scottish rugby union players
West of Scotland FC players
World Rugby Hall of Fame inductees